Ryan Millar (born 12 May 1994)  is a British professional rugby league footballer who plays on the  for the Widnes Vikings in the Betfred Championship.

Background
Millar was born in Biederfeld, Germany but brought up in Birmingham, England. He trained as an Architect in Sheffield.

Playing career
Millar is a graduate of the Sheffield Eagles Academy system He made his professional debut for the Eagles on 26 June 2015 in a 14 points to 22 away triumph at London Broncos, he scored two consecutive tries in 5 minutes to put his team 10–6 in front just after the half-time break. Millar made his home debut against Hull Kingston Rovers in The Qualifiers at Bramall Lane. This time he scored a hat-trick in a 28–38 loss. Millar has forced his way into a regular first team spot ahead of the 2016 season, as one of the newest young talents to come out the Eagles' youth set-up. During that season he made eight starts and scored a total of 5 tries. Millar played a total of 22 games (21 starts) during 2017, but his scoring run dried up as he only managed the one try against Oldham on the first day of the season. In 2019 he helped the Eagles to win the inaugural 1895 Cup as they defeated Widnes Vikings 36–18 in the final. In 2021 it was announced Millar was set to leave the club at the end of the season.

References

External links
Sheffield Eagles profile

1994 births
Living people
Bradford Bulls players
English rugby league players
Rugby league wingers
Sheffield Eagles players
Widnes Vikings players